Stefanie Bircher (née Biller, born 30 October 1985) is a long-distance swimmer from Germany. She has twice won medals at the European Championships, whereas her best achievements at the world championships were fourth place in 2004 and fifth place in 2006 in 25 km.

She previously trained at the University of Bath where she studied for a Foundation Degree in Sports Performance. She shared the same coach (Andrei Vorontsov) as her Bath team mate, British distance swimmer Alan Bircher whom she later married in 2011.

References

External links
 

1985 births
Living people
German female swimmers
German female long-distance swimmers
Sportspeople from Augsburg
20th-century German women
21st-century German women